Richard Russell may refer to:

Politics
Richard M. Russell (1891–1977), American politician, U.S. Representative from Massachusetts
Richard Russell Jr. (1897–1971), governor and U.S. Senator from Georgia
R. J. Russell (Richard John Russell, 1872–1943), British dental surgeon and Liberal politician
Richard Russell (MP for Dunwich), Member of Parliament (MP) for Dunwich, 1420–1427
Richard Russell (MP for City of York) (died 1435), MP for City of York

Sports
Richard Russell (rugby union) (1879–1960), English rugby union footballer
Richard Russell (rugby league) (born 1967), English rugby league footballer
Dick Russell (footballer) (1922–1974), Australian rules footballer for Port Adelaide
Richard Russell (tennis) (born 1945), Jamaican tennis player

Other
 Richard Russell (doctor) (1687–1759), English doctor from the 18th century
 Richard Russell Sr. (1861–1938), chief justice of the Georgia Supreme Court
 Richard Joel Russell (1895–1971), American geologist and geographer, winner of Cullum Geographical Medal 
 Richard Russell (Dow Theory) (1924–2015), American stock market letter writer
 Richard Russell (XL Recordings) (born 1971), British head of label XL Recordings
 Richard T. Russell, British computer scientist
 , a United States Navy attack submarine, 1975–1994
 Richard Russell, American airport ground worker who stole and crashed a commercial airplane in 2018

See also
 Russell (surname)

Russell, Richard